Acartia simplex is a species of marine copepod belonging to the family Acartiidae. It is found in the waters near Australia and New Zealand.

This species, just under 1 mm in length, is rather similar to Acartia ensifera but can be distinguished by the presence of spines on the dorsal part of the posterior body segment (metasome). Like A. ensifera, it is found around the coasts of New Zealand, mainly in estuarine habitats.

References

Calanoida
Crustaceans of the Indian Ocean
Crustaceans of the Pacific Ocean
Marine crustaceans of New Zealand
Crustaceans described in 1905
Taxa named by Georg Ossian Sars